Rosa Yisell Aquino Mareco (born 15 September 1990) is a Paraguayan footballer who plays as a midfielder. She has been a member of the Paraguay women's national team.

International career
Aquino played for Paraguay at senior level in the 2010 South American Women's Football Championship.

Honours

Club
Sportivo Limpeño
Copa Libertadores Femenina: 2016

References

1990 births
Living people
Women's association football midfielders
Paraguayan women's footballers
Paraguay women's international footballers
Cerro Porteño players
20th-century Paraguayan women
21st-century Paraguayan women